Beyuz-e Yek (also Romanized as Beyūẕ-e Yek; also known as Beyūẕ and Boyūz) is a village in Esmailiyeh Rural District, in the Central District of Ahvaz County, Khuzestan Province, Iran. At the 2006 census, its population was 454, in 69 families.

References 

Populated places in Ahvaz County